Together at Last is the first solo album by Wilco's Jeff Tweedy. It was released on June 23, 2017 by dBpm Records. It marks the first release of a proposed retrospective series titled Loft Acoustic Sessions that will see Tweedy revisit songs from Wilco's catalog, as well as from his Golden Smog and Loose Fur side projects.

Track listing
All music and lyrics by Jeff Tweedy except where noted.
 "Via Chicago" – 5:06
 "Laminated Cat" (music by Tweedy, Jim O'Rourke and Glenn Kotche) – 3:49
 "Lost Love" – 2:28
 "Muzzle of Bees" (music by Tweedy and Jim O'Rourke) – 3:49
 "Ashes of American Flags" (music by Tweedy and Jay Bennett) – 3:45
 "Dawned on Me" (music by Tweedy and Pat Sansone) – 2:52
 "In a Future Age" (music by Tweedy and Jay Bennett) – 2:52
 "I Am Trying to Break Your Heart" (music by Tweedy and Jay Bennett) – 3:40
 "Hummingbird" – 3:17
 "I'm Always in Love" (music by Tweedy and Jay Bennett) – 3:31
 "Sky Blue Sky" – 3:13

Personnel
Jeff Tweedy – vocals, guitar, harmonica, production
Tom Schtick – production, engineer, mixing
Bob Ludwig – mastering

Charts

References

External links

2017 albums
Jeff Tweedy albums
DBpm Records albums
Albums produced by Jeff Tweedy